Hensley Felix Koeiman (born 21 May 1956) is a Curaçaoan politician who served as the 6th Prime Minister of Curaçao between 23 December 2016 and 24 March 2017. A member of the Partido MAN, he was Minister of Social Affairs, Employment and Welfare in the Gerrit Schotte cabinet (October 2010 – September 2012). Afterwards Koeiman served in the Parliament of Curaçao from the 2012 general election until his appointment as Prime Minister. Since 29 May 2017 he has been Minister of Social Affairs, Employment and Welfare in the Eugene Rhuggenaath cabinet.

Career
Koeiman was born in Wacawa, Banda Bou, Curaçao, on 21 May 1956. He was also head of the country building service of the Netherlands Antilles as well as head of the facilitary services of the Bank of the Netherlands Antilles.

From 2007 until the dissolution of the Netherlands Antilles on 10 October 2010, Koeiman was member of the island council of Curaçao. He was number five of the candidate list for the 2010 Curaçao general election.

On 1 June 2013 Koeiman was elected Partido MAN party leader and succeeded Charles Cooper.

Koeiman was lijsttrekker for the Partido MAN for the 2016 Curaçao general election. His party won the most votes, resulting in four seats in the Estates. Koeiman stated he was ready to take a role in government. On 14 December a coalition agreement was signed between the Partido MAN, the Party for the Restructured Antilles (PAR), National People's Party (PNP) and Sovereign People (PS). Kenneth Gijsbertha of the Partido Man had been formateur. Koeiman was designated as Prime Minister of Curaçao. A new cabinet could not be immediately installed pending screening of the ministers.

Prime Minister
Koeiman's cabinet was sworn in by Governor George-Wout on 23 December 2016. Seven members of  Parliament joined the cabinet.

Source:

On 12 February 2017 the Koeiman cabinet fell after Sovereign People withdrew its support in Parliament. The Sovereign People parliamentarians in their letter of withdrawal of support also announced to support a government led by the Movement for the Future of Curaçao of Gerrit Schotte. Koeiman stated that there had been pressure on his government coalition from the start. His cabinet continued as a demissionary cabinet. Koeiman announced he wished to hold new elections on 28 April 2017.

On 24 March 2017 Koeiman was succeeded as Prime Minister by Gilmar Pisas.

Political career
On 29 May 2017 he joined the cabinet of Eugene Rhuggenaath as Minister of Social Affairs, Employment and Welfare. On 13 June 2019 he announced he was willing to vacate the position of leader of the Partido MAN. On 12 August 2019 the party granted his request and started a search for a new leader.

During the COVID-19 pandemic in Curaçao following the introduction of a lockdown, Koeiman stated that nobody would be allowed to be on the streets, with the exception of vital-care workers. This was the first time in the history of Curaçao.

Personal life
Koeiman is divorced. He has six children.

References

1956 births
Living people
Prime Ministers of Curaçao
Government ministers of Curaçao
Social affairs ministers of Curaçao
Members of the Estates of Curaçao
Partido MAN politicians